Martin Rawson Patrick McGuire (1897 - 15 March 1969) was an American classicist and the senior editor of The New Catholic Encyclopedia, for which he wrote 114 articles.

Early life
Martin Rawson Patrick McGuire was born in 1897.

Career
McGuire spent his whole career at The Catholic University of America, joining as a graduate assistant while he studied for his MA. He received his PhD there in 1927 for a dissertation on St. Ambrose. He became, in succession, ordinary professor, graduate dean, and chair of the Department of Greek and Latin from 1949 to 1962.

He was senior editor of The New Catholic Encyclopedia, for which he wrote 114 articles.

Death
McGuire died on 15 March 1969.

Selected publications
Sancti S. Ambrosii De Nabuthae: A commentary &c., Washington D.C., 1927. (Translator) (Patristic Studies No. 15)
The Confessions of St. Augustine: Books I-IX (Selections), Prentice-Hall, New York, 1931. (Introduction, notes and vocabulary, with James Marshall Campbell) (Reprinted by Bolchazy-Carducci Publishers, 1984, 2007).
Introduction to classical scholarship: A syllabus and bibliographical guide, Catholic University of America Press, Washington D.C., 1961. (2nd edition 1968)
Teaching Latin in the modern world, Catholic University of America Press, Washington D.C., 1961.
The political and cultural history of the ancient world: A syllabus, with suggested readings, Catholic University of America Press, Washington D.C., 1961.
Introduction to medieval Latin studies: A syllabus and bibliographical guide, 2nd edition, Catholic University of America Press, Washington D.C., 1977.  (With Hermigild Dressler)

References 

20th-century American historians
American male non-fiction writers
American Roman Catholics
Catholic University of America faculty
American classical scholars
American editors
1897 births
1969 deaths
Catholic University of America alumni
20th-century American male writers